Le Prix de la Liberté is a 1978 drama film directed by Jean-Pierre Dikongué Pipa.

Synopsis
After refusing the sexual advances of her village chief and her father’s authority, a young woman runs away from home and goes to town. There she meets several members of her family and tries to start her life from scratches. She enrolls at a high school and makes new friends.
However, she realizes that social relations in town also depend on sexual favors and that around her everyone has given in to that practice. When she loses the only man she loved, the girl returns to her village and sets it on fire.

See also
Jean Pierre Dikongue-Pipa 
History of Cinema in Cameroon

External links
 
Article (in French) in the Africultures website.
Article (in French) in Africine.

1978 films
1978 drama films
Cameroonian drama films
1970s French-language films